The Sulphur Gulch is one of the tributaries of the Cherry Creek and is located in the U.S. states of Colorado. It is part of the Eastern Plains.

Description

The Gulch flows west through eastern Douglas County, and discharges into Cherry Creek in Bar CCC Park. The Gulch is dry during the summer unless there is heavy rain; it is full during spring after snow melt. The Gulch has flooded several times.

Recreational Opportunities
There are trails along the Gulch.

See also
List of rivers of Colorado

References

External links
USGS: South Platte River Basin
University of Colorado: GIS Hydro Data for the South Platte
 City of Denver: South Platte Initiative
Eleven Mile Reservoir
The Greenway Foundation
Spinney Mountain Reservoir
Strontia Springs Reservoir and Waterton Canyon

Rivers of Colorado
Tributaries of the Platte River
Rivers of Douglas County, Colorado